Vadim Nikolayevich Vlasov (born 19 December 1980) is a former Russian football player.

Vlasov played in the Russian Premier League with FC Lokomotiv Nizhny Novgorod.

He is a younger brother of Dmitri Vlasov.

References

1980 births
Living people
Russian footballers
FC Lokomotiv Nizhny Novgorod players
Russian Premier League players
FC Dynamo Moscow reserves players

Association football goalkeepers